The 2016 West Coast Conference women's basketball tournament was held March 3–8, 2016, at Orleans Arena in the Las Vegas Valley community of Paradise, Nevada. Seeds will be determined solely on conference record. San Francisco won the conference's automatic bid to the 2016 NCAA Division I women's basketball tournament.

Seeds
WCC tiebreaker procedures went as follows:
Head-to-head
Better record against a higher seed
Higher RPI

* Overall record at end of regular season.

Schedule

Bracket and scores
All BYUtv games were simulcast online and streamed at TheW.tv.

Game Summaries

Pacific vs. Pepperdine
Series History: Pacific leads series 6–3
Broadcasters: Spencer Linton & Kristen Kozlowski

Loyola Marymount vs. Portland
Series History: Portland leads series 31–29
Broadcasters: Spencer Linton & Kristen Kozlowski

San Diego vs. San Francisco
Series History: San Diego leads series 38–27
Broadcasters: Dave McCann & Blaine Fowler

Santa Clara vs. Gonzaga
Series History: Gonzaga leads series 34–28
Broadcasters: Dave McCann & Blaine Fowler

BYU vs. Pepperdine
Series History: BYU leads series 12–2
Broadcasters: Spencer Linton & Kristen Kozlowski

Saint Mary's vs. Loyola Marymount
Series History: Saint Mary's leads series 45–16
Broadcasters: Spencer Linton & Kristen Kozlowski

BYU vs. Santa Clara
Series History: BYU leads series 12–1
Broadcasters: Dave McCann & Blaine Fowler

Saint Mary's vs. San Francisco
Series History: Saint Mary's leads series 39–24
Broadcasters: Dave McCann & Blaine Fowler

WCC Championship: BYU vs. San Francisco
Series History: BYU leads series 15–2
Broadcasters: Roxy Bernstein & Chiney Ogwumike (ESPNU)
Dave McCann & Blaine Fowler (BYU Radio)

All-Tournament team

See also
2015–16 NCAA Division I women's basketball season
West Coast Conference men's basketball tournament
2016 West Coast Conference men's basketball tournament
West Coast Conference women's basketball tournament

References

External links

Tournament
West Coast Conference women's basketball tournament
West Coast Conference women's basketball tournament
West Coast Conference women's basketball tournament
Basketball competitions in the Las Vegas Valley
College basketball tournaments in Nevada
Women's sports in Nevada
College sports tournaments in Nevada